Nabo Bekinbo Graham-Douglas,  ( 15 July 1926 – 18 December 1983) was a Nigerian Lawyer who became Federal Attorney-General and Commissioner for Justice in 1972.

Early life 
Graham-Douglas was born on 15 July 1926 in Abonnema in Rivers State.

Education 
Graham-Douglas began his elementary education at Nyemoni Primary School in Abonnema and then attended Kalabari National College in Buguma. He proceeded to Exeter University in England for legal studies. He then entered King's College, University of London, and later the Institute of Advanced Studies in London where he was called to Bar on 23 November 1954.

Career 
After returning to Nigeria, Graham-Douglas set up in private practice and won recognition for many successful cases he defended. Following the first military coup that toppled the Government of Alhaji Sir Abubakar Tafawa Balewa in January 1966, Nabo was appointed to serve as Attorney- General for Eastern Nigeria to succeed Dr Christopher Chukwuemeka Mojekwu by the new Military Government. He could not retain his office because of the hostilities between the federal authorities and break-away Biafra. He was point-blank opposed to the secession of the Eastern region and eventually resigned his post. For this reason, he was detained briefly by the secessionists, therefore bringing an end to his tenure as Attorney-General of the region in September 1967. Following the constitutional re-arrangements which allowed for the splitting of Nigeria's four regions into 12 states, the Eastern region was split into East-Central, Cross Rivers and Rivers State. Graham-Douglas was appointed the Attorney-General and Commissioner for Justice of Rivers State. He remained in that post for three years, then in 1972 was appointed Attorney-General and Commissioner for Justice for the Federation in the regime of General Yakubu Gowon.

Later life and death 
After the coup of July 1975 which overthrew the Government of General Yakubu Gowon, Graham-Douglas lost his post as Attorney-General and went once more into private practice until his death on 18 December 1983.

References 

20th-century Nigerian lawyers
1926 births
Alumni of King's College London
People from Abonnema
1983 deaths
Attorneys General of Nigeria
Senior Advocates of Nigeria
People from Rivers State